Wodapalooza Fitness Festival (WZA) is an annual four-day functional fitness festival held in Miami centered on a CrossFit competition. The event was first established in 2012 and has since developed into one of the largest fitness festival in the world and a major CrossFit competition with thousands of athletes from around the world competing.

History

Wodapalooza was founded in 2012 by Guido Trinidad and Steve Suarez. They were originally invited to run free CrossFit classes at Bayfront Park in the summer of 2011, but were offered the possibility of turning it into a competition event by the park manager. The first competition of "Wodapalooza Miami - A Fitness Festival" was a single-day competition held on Saturday, February 4, 2012, with some preliminary events the previous day. The competition is named after "WOD" or CrossFit's "Workout of the Day", while "" denotes a festival or large-scale event. The first Wodapalooza had 145 participating athletes and 500 spectators.

The event proved highly popular and it quickly expanded in the following years.  The number of athletes competing increased to 507 the second year, over 1,300 in 2016, around 2,000 by 2019, and over 3,000 by 2022. Due to increasing participation, the number of competing athletes at the competition had to be limited and an online qualification stage was introduced starting in 2014 for those who did not receive an invitation to compete. The number of days of competition increased to two in 2013 (Saturday and Sunday), and eventually to four (Thursday to Sunday) by 2017, and the number of competition stages at the venue also increased to four. The number of attendees rose to 7,000 in 2015, 30,000 in 2017, and up to 40,000 by 2022. The prize purse also experienced similar growth; the total prize purse increased from $5,000 in the first year, $10,000 in 2014, to $500,000 in 2022. The 2022 event featured the biggest prize purse yet with the elite individual winners receiving $100,000, up from $50,000 the previous competition.

Although the competition events for elite athletes are the main focus, Wodapalooza also provides fitness competitions for athletes of different age range and abilities from the early days. In 2015, Wodapalooza became the first major functional fitness competition to offer an adaptive division for athletes with disabilities and impairement. There were 50 divisions by 2022.

Trinidad and Suarez partnered with Loud and Live in 2017 to run the Wodapalooza event in 2018. Loud and Live then acquired Wodapalooza in the months following the event.

In October 2018, Wodapalooza was announced as a sanctioned event for the 2019 CrossFit Games where the winner can earn qualification for the Games. Its name was changed from Wodapalooza Fitness Festival Miami (used since 2014) to Wodapalooza CrossFit Festival for the next two seasons. In order to comply with the format for teams at the CrossFit Games, a mixed teams of four was added in addition to its usual teams of three separated by gender in 2019. In 2020, the event was moved from January of previous years to February, and there was no competition for elite teams of three.

The 2021 event was cancelled due to the ongoing Covid-19 pandemic. The organizer of the event also opted not to be part of the CrossFit Games season in the following year, and moved the event back to January. The 2022 event was streamed live free for the first time in 2022.

Wodapalooza announced a change to its format for the 2023 event, with elite individual athletes competing over two days on Thursday and Friday, and the elite teams competing over the final two days on Saturday and Sunday.  Cuts in the number of competitors during the competition were also introduced this year. This year is the first to have a title sponsor, TYR, with the festival branded TYR Wodapalooza Fitness Festival.

Venue

Wodapalooza is held at the Bayfront Park fronting Biscayne Bay in Miami. It features four stages for competition: Flagler; Bayside; The Deck; and Tina Hill. The Flagler stage is the biggest with a seating capacity of 5,000. The Gantlet is held at the Deck.

Competitions
There 48 divisions in the CrossFit competition, ranging from the elite men and women to various age and adaptive divisions.  The team competitions feature three-member teams of men and women.

Wodapalooza may also feature various event, such as Weightlifting Faceoff, a one-day Olympic lifting competition; WZA Strong, a competition that mixes strongman and functional fitness movements; and the Gauntlet.

Events
Eight or nine scored events may be held at Wodapalooza for the individual and team CrossFit competition. The events are typically combinations of various CrossFit-type movements in weightlifting, gymnastics and monostructural workouts.  Wodapalooza always features an event that features swimming.

Winners

References

External links
 Videos from Loud and Live
 Wodapalooza leaderboard

2012 establishments in Florida
International sports competitions hosted by the United States
CrossFit
Sports in Miami